Trine Pertou Mach (born 9 October 1969) is a Danish politician serving as Member of the Folketing for the Red–Green Alliance since the 2022 election. She previously served as Member of the Folketing for the Green Left from 2013 to 2015, but switched to the Red-Green Alliance in 2022.

Career 
Studying political science at Aarhus University, Mach graduated in 1998 and went on to work in the European government, at the WWF and Danish Institute for Human Rights.

Mach served two brief stints from April 2009 and January 2011 to May 2009 and June 2011 respectively in the Folketing for the Green Left as a substitute for Ida Auken, having failed to win her own seat in 2007.

In 2013 Mach replaced then Green Left leader Villy Søvndal as Member of the Folketing after he suffered a heart attack and quit politics. Mach had previously dropped her candidacy in 2012 as a protest against Søvndal's party line.

Having left the Green Left in 2015, Mach joined the Red–Green Alliance on 11 November 2021, initially stating she had no intention to return to politics, but later becoming the party's top candidate in the Zealand constituency for the 2022 election on 31 May 2022. Mach won a seat in said election with 1,737 personal votes.

Personal life 
Mach is married and has three children.

References 

21st-century Danish women politicians
Living people
Members of the Folketing 2022–2026
Red–Green Alliance (Denmark) politicians
Socialist People's Party (Denmark) politicians
Women members of the Folketing
1969 births